The Lieutenant Governor of Delhi is the constitutional head of the National Capital Territory of Delhi. The post was first established in September 1966, when The Delhi Administration Act, 1966 came into effect. Thus the former Delhi Legislative Assembly was replaced by the Delhi Metropolitan Council with 56 elected and 5 nominated members with the Lieutenant Governor of Delhi as its head. The Council however had no legislative powers, only an advisory role in the governance of Delhi. This setup functioned until 1990, when the Assembly was reinstated; the position of Lieutenant Governor retained its role.

The National Capital Territory of Delhi (Amendment) Bill, 2021 was introduced in Parliament of India and was passed by both Lok Sabha and Rajya Sabha. The bill states that the Government referred to in any law to be made by the Legislative Assembly shall mean the Lieutenant Governor.

Lieutenant Governor Anil Baijal, a former Union Home Secretary has resigned & sent his resignation letter to President of India on 18 May 2022. His official residence is in Raj Niwas, Delhi.

Chief Commissioners
Delhi was earlier head by a Chief Commissioner who was an ICS officer.

Lieutenant governors
In 1966 the Delhi Administration Act was passed which set up a  Delhi Metropolitan Council with the Lieutenant Governor of Delhi as its head. So far there have been 21 holders of this post, including 12 IAS officers, 4 ICS officers, 2 IPS officers, 2 senior IAF officers and 1 IFS officer backgrounds who held this post. Appointees were generally retired with the exception of Najeeb Jung who resigned from the service.

See also
 Government of Delhi
 Governors in India
 Union territory
 Chief Minister of Delhi
 Gupta Dynasty

References

External links
 Lieutenant Governor of Delhi, Official website

 
Lieutenant governors
Delhi